Bolton Meredith Eyres-Monsell, 1st Viscount Monsell,  (22 February 1881 – 21 March 1969) was a British Conservative Party politician who served as Chief Whip until 1931 and then as First Lord of the Admiralty.

Biography
His parents were Lt. Col. Bolton James Alfred Monsell, a soldier and a Chief Constable in the Metropolitan Police, and Mary Beverley, daughter of Sir Edmund Ogle, 6th Baronet. Bolton Monsell took the name Eyres upon his marriage to Caroline Mary Sybil Eyres in 1904, a marriage dissolved in 1950.

Eyres-Monsell served in the Royal Navy, where he was promoted sub-lieutenant on 15 July 1900, and lieutenant on 15 July 1901. In June 1902 he was posted to the newly completed torpedo boat destroyer HMS Success, serving in the Portsmouth instructional flotilla, but only two months later, in August 1902, he was transferred to the battleship HMS Magnificent, flagship of the second in command, Channel Squadron.

He was elected as Member of Parliament for the Evesham Division of Worcestershire in January 1910 general election, and served until 1935.  During the First World War, he again served as a Royal Navy officer, achieving the rank of Commander and was awarded the Order of the Nile by the Sultan of Egypt. He was Civil Lord of the Admiralty from April 1921 to October 1922; then Parliamentary and Financial Secretary to the Admiralty until May 1923, Parliamentary Secretary to the Treasury from July 1923 to January 1924, and again from November 1924 to June 1929 and from September 1931 to November 1931.  He became First Lord of the Admiralty in 1931, helped negotiate the Anglo-German Naval Agreement, retaining his office in government until 1936.

He was appointed a Knight Grand Cross of the Order of the British Empire (GBE) in 1929 and was created Viscount Monsell, of Evesham in the County of Worcester on 30 November 1935.

He married a second time on 25 July 1950 to Essex Leila Hilary French. He was succeeded in the viscountcy by his son Graham. His second daughter, the Hon. Joan Eyres-Monsell (1912–2003), was married for the second time in 1968 to Patrick Leigh Fermor, the traveller and author. Lord Monsell's nephew was the British arctic explorer Henry George Watkins (1907–1932).

A suburb of Leicester is named Eyres Monsell after him; the housing estate was built on land he had owned before it was compulsorily purchased in the early 1950s.

Arms

See also
Dumbleton Hall

References

External links 

1881 births
1969 deaths
Eyres-Monsell, Bolton
First Lords of the Admiralty
Eyres-Monsell, Bolton
Knights Grand Cross of the Order of the British Empire
Members of the Privy Council of the United Kingdom
Treasurers of the Household
Eyres-Monsell, Bolton
Eyres-Monsell, Bolton
Eyres-Monsell, Bolton
Eyres-Monsell, Bolton
Eyres-Monsell, Bolton
Eyres-Monsell, Bolton
Eyres-Monsell, Bolton
Eyres-Monsell, Bolton
UK MPs who were granted peerages
Viscounts in the Peerage of the United Kingdom
Conservative Party (UK) hereditary peers
People educated at Stubbington House School
Viscounts created by George V